

Jajpur (also known as Jajapur) is  a town and a municipality in Jajpur district in the Indian state of Odisha. It was the capital of the Kesari dynasty, later supplanted by Cuttack. Now, it is the headquarter of Jajpur district.

Etymology and names 
Jajpur, the place of the ancient Biraja Temple, was originally known as Biraja. Other names of the town in the ancient texts include Viranja, Varanja-nagara, Varaha-tirtha. The Bhauma-Kara kings established their capital city of Guhadevapataka (or Guheshvarapataka), identified with modern Gohiratikar (or Gohiratikra) near Jajpur. The later Somavanshi kings moved their capital from Yayatinagara (modern Binka) to Guheshvarapataka, and renamed the town Abhinava-Yayatinagara ("the new city of Yayati").

Later, the Jajpur town came to be known as Yajanagara. According to one theory, this name is a corruption of "Yayatinagara". Another theory is that it derives from the Brahmanical sacrifices (Yajna) that became popular during the Ganga-Gajapati period (11th-16th century). In the Muslim chronicles such as Tabaqat-i-Nasiri and Tarikh-i-Firuzshahi, the town's name was mentioned as "Jajnagar". Later, the suffix "-nagar" ("town") was replaced with the equivalent "-pur", and the town's name became "Jajpur".

History
Earliest account of Jajpur is part of the history of the Odisha. It was the capital of Keshari King Yayati Keshari in 473 CE. Accounts by Chinese travelers mention Jajpur as capital in 7th century. It has been a center of Tantrism. The Buddhist kingdom of  Bhauma Karas also kept Jajpur as their capital in 8th century CE. Many Buddhist structures have been unearthed in and around Jajpur that point to the Buddhist past of the town.

Geography and climate

The climate of Jajpur District is normal as per Indian standards. All the seasons arrive in the District at their usual time. The District's average height from the sea level is 331 m and its average rain fall is 1014.5 mm. The average maximum and minimum temperatures are 40 degree C and 10 degree C respectively. Overall, the climate of the District is neither hotter nor cooler. The summer season is from March to June when the climate is hot and humid. Thunderstorms are common at the height of the summer. The monsoon months are from July to October when the town receives most of its rainfall from the South West Monsoon. The annual rainfall is around 1014.5 mm. The winter season from November to February is characterised by mild temperatures and occasional showers.

Demographics

As of 2011 Indian Census, Jajpur municipality had a total population of 37,458, of which 19,216 were males and 18,242 were females. Population within the age group of 0 to 6 years was 3,823. The total number of literates in Jajpur was 29,975, which constituted 80.0% of the population with male literacy of 83.5% and female literacy of 76.4%. The effective literacy rate of 7+ population of Jajpur was 89.1%, of which male literacy rate was 92.9% and female literacy rate was 85.1%. The Scheduled Castes and Scheduled Tribes population was 6,363 and 565 respectively. Jajpur had 8198 households in 2011.

Education

Colleges
N.C. Autonomous College, Jajpur Town
S G College, Kanikapada, Jajpur
V. N. Autonomous College, Jajpur Road
[Baba Bhairavananda Autonomous Mahavidyalaya],Chandikhol,Jajpur

Places of interest

see also 
 Chari Kshetra

References

Bibliography

External links

 

Jajpur district
Cities and towns in Jajpur district